Leabhar Donn is a 15th-century genealogical manuscript, seemingly written and compiled on the borders of Sligo and Leitrim. It was written in two periods: 1432–1441 and 1476–1482.

Sources
 The Celebrated Antiquary, p. 156, Nollaig Ó Muraíle, Maynooth, 1996.

External links
 Irish Script On Screen - Meamram Páipéar Ríomhaire
 Keltische talen en cultuur - Geesteswetenschappen - Studenten | Universiteit Utrecht
 https://www.webcitation.org/query?url=http://www.geocities.com/Athens/Aegean/2444/irish/LD.htm&date=2009-10-25+05:47:51

Irish manuscripts
Irish genealogy
Irish-language literature
15th-century books
15th-century manuscripts
Medieval genealogies and succession lists